The Fate of Maria Keith (German:Das Schicksal der Maria Keith) is a 1919 German silent film directed by Rudolf Walther-Fein and starring Hans Werder, Maria Zelenka and Hans Wallner.

Cast
 Hans Werder as Sebaldus Keith auf Kellinghausen  
 Maria Zelenka as Maria, seine Tochter  
 Hans Wallner as Professor Seidelbast, Marias Lehrer  
 Gustav Jahrbeck as Theodor Bollingbrock - Keiths Neffe  
 Clara Heinrich as Anette von Gellwitz  
 Ernst Pittschau as Bernhard von Gellwitz, ihr Sohn

External links

1919 films
Films of the Weimar Republic
Films directed by Rudolf Walther-Fein
German silent feature films
German black-and-white films
1910s German films